
Gmina Jasień is an urban-rural gmina (administrative district) in Żary County, Lubusz Voivodeship, in western Poland.

Villages
Apart from the town of Jasień, Gmina Jasień contains the villages and settlements of Bieszków, Bronice, Budziechów, Golin, Guzów, Jabłoniec, Jaryszów, Jasionna, Jurzyn, Lipsk Żarski, Lisia Góra, Mirkowice, Roztoki, Świbna, Wicina, Zabłocie and Zieleniec.

Neighbouring gminas
Gmina Jasień is bordered by the gminas of Lipinki Łużyckie, Lubsko, Nowogród Bobrzański, Tuplice and Żary.

Twin towns – sister cities

Gmina Jasień is twinned with:
 Spreetal, Germany

References

Jasien
Żary County